Mom Luang Chuchat Kamphu (4 January 1905 – 13 April 1969) was a Thai irrigation engineer who pioneered modern irrigation construction in the country. He served as Director-General of the Royal Irrigation Department, and oversaw the construction of Bhumibol Dam, the country's first (and only) concrete arch dam, completed in 1964. He also served as Deputy Minister of National Development and  President of Kasetsart University.

References

Chuchat Kamphu
Chuchat Kamphu
Irrigation engineers
Chuchat Kamphu
Chuchat Kamphu
Chuchat Kamphu
Chuchat Kamphu
Chuchat Kamphu
1905 births
1969 deaths
20th-century engineers